Music and Some Highly Musical People is a history of African-American music by James Monroe Trotter first published in 1878. It represents perhaps the first attempt to assess American music across multiple genres in a single volume.

The book includes biographies of more than forty African-American musicians and touring groups. Notable inclusions were Elizabeth Taylor Greenfield, Henry F. Williams, Thomas J. Bowers, Thomas Greene Bethune, Rachel M. Washington, Sarah Sedgewick Bowers, the Jubilee Singers of Fisk University, and the Georgia Minstrels.

Reception
The book is an example of a number of works of that era for which "uplifting the race" was a main goal. As with other works, this task was done while traits such as "character, modesty, and industry" were emphasized as a way to "assure whites" that blacks were not a threat. This balance is exemplified by the work of Booker T. Washington, who was at that time beginning his career. Reception of the book initially followed the color line, with most white music critics and historians, especially outside of Trotter's home city of Boston, ignoring the book. Black historians, biographers, and encyclopedists quoted and borrowed freely from the work.

Contents
Trotter's work is highly reflective of the society in which it was written.  In his discussion of, for example, Elizabeth Greenfield, Trotter is unable to examine problematic coverage of the singer lest he alienate a white audience which would not recognize the negative effects of stereotyping of black musicians. For instance, he quotes with some approval reviews of Greenfield describing her talent as "untaught" and "innate", subordinating Greenfield to white, civilized, educated musicians. Historian Lawrence Schenbeck describes how Trotter's work shows examples of the Culture of Dissemblance, that is, rejection of a stereotype by becoming the exact opposite of that stereotype. As an example, Trotter's description of Greenfield emphasized childlike moral perfection.

On the other hand, Trotter's work was itself not immune to the scientific racism of the period, for instance he praises lightness of skin and repeats arguments of phrenologists about the relationship between character and cranium shape.

Trotter's coverage of classical music was influenced by a movement to raise classical music and its performance to the level of religious service. A leader in this movement was white journalist John Sullivan Dwight. With this reverence on classical music, Trotter's description of classical soloists such as Thomas Wiggins and Sisieretta Jones become examples of racial culture and uplift through the musical genre itself. However, instead of reassuring whites, encroachment by blacks on white cultural territory described in the book was sometimes at best seen as a curiosity and at worst an affront.

Trotter also covered vernacular music. Trotter covered gospel musicians with much approval, particularly the Fisk Jubilee Singers. On the other hand, Trotter agreed that minstrelsy was usually "disgusting...buffoonery". Even so, the book was the first revisionist look at black minstrelsy, an approach which suggests that out of the racist stereotyping and caricature of the style came the chance for musical expression, employment, and audience happiness. As an example, the book discusses the work of the Georgia Minstrels.

Influence
Eileen Southern calls the book, "the first time that anyone, black or white, had attempted to assess a body of American music that cut across genres and styles".

The book fits into a body of literature of that era and later. In 1883, white composer Frederic Louis Ritter published a similar book about American music as a whole, Music in America, which acknowledges Trotter's research on the contributions by African-Americans to vernacular and classical music. The book more directly influenced many later works on African-American music, especially by black authors, including Penman Lovinggood Sr.'s Famous Modern Negro Musicians in 1921. In 1936, two publications by black authors, Alain LeRoy Locke's, The Negro and His Music and Maud Cuney Hare's Negro Musicians and Their Music, as well as more recent publications such as the work of Eileen Southern, who published The Music of Black Americans: A History in 1971 (second edition in 1983) and began editing the journal The Black Perspective in Music in 1973. Another major, related journal is Black Music Research Journal founded in 1980.

List of individuals with biographies in anthology

Joseph G. Anderson
William Appo
Dennis Auguste
Basile Bares
Thomas Greene Bethune
William Brady
Nellie E. Brown
Sarah Sedgewick Bowers
Thomas J. Bowers
James Caseras
Colored American Opera Company
Walter F. Craig
Edmond Dédé
James Gloucester Demarest
Marice J. B. Doublet
John T. Douglass
Dupre Family
Fisk Jubilee Singers
Georgia Minstrels
Elizabeth Taylor Greenfield
Justin Holland
Hyers Sisters
Samuel W. Jamison
Frank Johnson
Lambert Family
Frederick Elliot Lewis
Luca Family Singers
Samuel Lucas
E. V. Macarty
Thomas Martin
Charls Martinez
John Moore
Peter P. O'Fake
Samuel Snaer
William H. Starr
G. H. W. Stewart
Rachel M. Washington
Joseph White
A. P. Williams
Henry F. Williams

External links
Edition at archive.org

References

Sources
Schenbeck, Lawrence. Racial Uplift and American Music, 1878-1943. Univ. Press of Mississippi, 2012.
Southern, Eileen. The music of black Americans: A history. WW Norton & Company, 1997.

1878 books
Books about African-American history
Lists of African-American people
United States biographical dictionaries